The Dallidet Adobe and Gardens is a California Historical Landmark (#720) in San Luis Obispo, California. The site was originally the property of Pierre Hypolite Dallidet, who came to San Francisco in search of gold in 1850.

His son, Paul Dallidet, transferred it to the San Luis Obispo County Historical Society in 1953, in his family's memory.

See also 
 City of San Luis Obispo Historic Resources

References 

California Historical Landmarks
Buildings and structures in San Luis Obispo, California
History of San Luis Obispo County, California
Religious buildings and structures completed in 1850
Adobe buildings and structures in California